The Gaiety Theatre was a popular entertainment venue in Melbourne, Australia, which operated from 1880 to 1930, when it became the Roxy movie theatre.

History
The Apollo Hall on Bourke Street east was renovated and reopened for the Australian Comedy and Dramatic Company as the Gaiety Theatre on 12 June 1880 with a performance of David Garrick with Henry Irving in the title role.

The owner of the Gaiety, the Bijou and much other nearby property, was John Alfred Wilson (c. 1833 – 23 September 1915), who had made a fortune in gold mining, and had a wide range of business interests. 

Wilson sold much of his Melbourne property to Ben Fuller, who reopened the Gaiety as the Roxy movie theatre in April 1930. He demolished the Roxy and the adjacent Palace Hotel in 1934, but whatever plans he had never eventuated and the site, on the southern side of Bourke Street between Russell and Swanston streets, was sold to the Commonwealth Bank in 1938.

References 

History of Melbourne
Former theatres in Melbourne
Demolished buildings and structures in Melbourne
Buildings and structures demolished in 1934